William or Willem Dervall (1642 – ca. 1711) was a Dutch-born Mayor of New York City from October 17, 1675 until October 14, 1676.

Biography
Dervall  was the son of Frans Jorisz Derval, a wealthy timber merchant in Amsterdam originating from Wijchen. In September 1665, Willem had found his way to the American East Coast, as the English Governor Nicolls issued him a letter of denization and granted him permission to trade anywhere in the English colonies of America. Dervall and his fellow merchant and (supposed) brother Jan/John arrived in 1667 from Boston in New York and set up a store on the corner of Whitehall Street and Pearl Street. He did good business, sending from time to time large quantities of goods to his brother Cornelis in Amsterdam. In September 1670, Willem married Rebecca Delavall, daughter of Thomas Delavall, Mayor of New York in 1666, 1670 and 1678, with whom he appears to have had just one child, a daughter Frances in 1681. In 1673-74, when the Dutch retook the city for half a year during the Third Anglo-Dutch War, Derval lost quite a bit when Anthony Colve confiscated property of representatives of Charles and the Duke of York. After Thomas Delavall's death in 1682, Dervall inherited Great Barent Island, now named Wards Island, and a large estate in Harlem. He later served as alderman in the City Council.

Family
Dervall was the one but youngest of a family of 14 children of Aagtje Huijgens (c. 1599–1652) and Frans Jorisz Derval (c. 1596–1669), who married in February 1624 in Amsterdam. His brother Joris (born 1631) was in 1671 a colonist in Torarica, in Suriname.
Jan/Johannes/John Dervall, who also used the surname "de Witt", married in November 1675 with Catharine van Courtlandt. After Jan's death in February 1689, Catharine remarried Jan's business partner, Colonel Frederick Philipse in 1692. In contrast, the aforementioned brother Cornelis Darvall (1640–1721), lived his whole live in Amsterdam, where he was a powerful merchant. To wit, Cornelis is thought to have arranged the quick release of Jacob Leisler, after Leisler and other New York citizens had been captured by Moorish pirates on a voyage to Europe in 1678; the other captives had to wait for over a year before New York Governor Edmund Andros could forward their ransom.

Notes

References

See also
 List of mayors of New York City

1642 births
1710s deaths
Dutch emigrants to the Thirteen Colonies
Mayors of New York City
Businesspeople from Amsterdam